Dr. Laurence Godfrey (born 21 November 1952) was educated at the independent The Haberdashers' Aske's Boys' School, at Westfield College, University of London (BSc Physics, first class honours, 1975) and at University College London (PhD, High Energy Nuclear Physics, 1982). He established a legal precedent for libel on Usenet, in the landmark Godfrey v Demon Internet Service case. He lives in France with his younger son Waylan and is unmarried, having twice been divorced. He is self-employed inter alia as an expert witness, consultant and technical adviser in Internet-related litigation.

History
In 1993 he and CERN colleague Phillip Hallam-Baker became immersed in a very public dispute on Usenet, which culminated in a libel action (settled out of court in Godfrey's favour).

Godfrey was a regular and controversial presence to the Usenet newsgroups soc.culture.british, soc.culture.canada, soc.culture.german and soc.culture.thai. His main topics of discourse there were the perceived and real shortcomings of the inhabitants of those countries.

He launched a series of court cases including Godfrey v Demon Internet Service. Godfrey has used Britain's strict libel laws to bring successful libel actions, suing in British courts a number of organizations based in other countries, including Cornell University and the University of Minnesota.

Libel cases 

 1995, Godfrey v. Hallam-Baker
 1997, Godfrey v. Demon Internet
 1998, Godfrey v. Cornell University/Dolenga
 1998, Godfrey v. University of Minnesota/Starnet/Quanchairut
 1998, Godfrey v. Melbourne PC Users Group
 (unknown) Godfrey v. New Zealand TeleCom
 (unknown) Godfrey v. Toronto Star

References

External links 
Cornell University & Minnesota cases story from 1998
New Scientist article freelance writing from 1992
Recent case in which Laurence Godfrey acted as expert/ technical consultant, his main occupation since 2001.

1952 births
Living people
People educated at Haberdashers' Boys' School